Harvey Wayne Miles (October 25, 1931July 17, 2012) was the final mayor of Renner, Texas.

Miles was born in Center City, Texas and grew up in rural Mills County, Texas. Miles was a plumber by trade and served as a plumbing inspector for the city of Odessa, Texas in addition to running his own plumbing business.

References

Mayors of places in Texas
1931 births
2012 deaths
People from Mills County, Texas
History of Dallas
People from Odessa, Texas
People from Collin County, Texas